Milatovac may refer to:

 Milatovac (Batočina), a village in Serbia
 Milatovac (Žagubica), a village in Serbia